"Shiny Happy People" is the twenty-second episode of the sixth season of the American television medical drama Grey's Anatomy, and the show's 124th episode overall. It premiered on May 13, 2010. Written by Zoanne Clack and Peter Nowalk, while directed by Ed Ornelas, the episode was viewed by 11.05 million Americans. In his review of the episode, The Huffington Post Michael Pascua said "Demi Lovato may have been the big celebrity name that was advertised on the commercials for Grey's Anatomy, but Marion Ross [...] had the most touching story." He also noted a change in Sandra Oh's character, Cristina Yang, wondering "what happened to the headstrong independent Cristina of yester-season". The episode earned Lovato a People's Choice Award for Favorite TV Guest Star.

Production
The episode was written by Zoanne Clack and Peter Nowalk, while Ed Ornelas directed it. On March 29, 2010, Demi Lovato announced on Twitter that they would film an episode of Grey's Anatomy during the week. It was later revealed that they would play a schizophrenic patient in a May episode. On April 14, Lovato posted a picture of themself on the set. Also appearing in the episode is Marion Ross, whose presence was confirmed on April 19. Jason George reprised his role as Miranda Bailey's love interest Ben Warren, while Jonathan Goldstein, Emily Bergl, Amy Farrington and Austin Highsmith made their first and only appearance as Ken, Trisha, Mary and Amber, respectively.

Clack and Nowalk initially pitched Shonda Rhimes the episode as ending with Warren thinking that he and Bailey were not in an exclusive relationship but this was changed as Rhimes felt it was not right. The theme was thought to be about "happiness" and it evolved to how difficult it is to actually find happiness, "how we all try to be happy, constantly searching for it, faking it even, just in case it actually decides to show up." During their writing session, Clack and Nowalk thought of having a scene involving Alex and Lexie leaving the party to "make whoopie" but that got cut.

Plot
The episode opens at a party for the Chief of surgery, Dr. Derek Shepherd, played by Patrick Dempsey. Dr. Owen Hunt, Kevin McKidd, approaches Dr. Cristina Yang, Sandra Oh, and asks her to move in with him. She willingly agrees but warns that she is a bit drunk and her judgement is impaired. Dr. Meredith Grey, Ellen Pompeo thinks that there is something going on between Owen and Dr. Teddy Altman, Kim Raver. One of the surgical residents, Dr. Reed Adamson, played by Nora Zehetner, wants to sleep with plastic surgeon Dr. Mark Sloan, Eric Dane. She approaches him at the party and they begin talking. Dr. Miranda Bailey, Chandra Wilson, with her boyfriend Dr. Ben Warren, Jason George, sets rules for how they are to act around each other at work. She does not believe in PDA in the workplace and does not want everyone to know they are in a relationship. Teddy is coming home and walks in on her nonexclusive boyfriend Mark sleeping with Reed.

The next day, an elderly woman named Betty, played by Marion Ross is brought into the Emergency Room and is in need of surgery on her arm for broken bones she received from a car accident. Across the ER, an older man named Henry is brought in for abdominal injuries he received from passing out. The doctors diagnose him with an irregular heart rhythm. Henry recognizes Betty from across the room. They are old friends who have not seen each other in many years. They begin to talk and reminisce, but have to part to get tests done. Bailey is acting extra cheerful and Derek and Mark notice this in the elevator. She is humming a song and being very friendly. After she leaves, Ben enters humming the same song. He, too, is very happy. Derek and Mark infer that they are dating and had spent the night together. Dr. Alex Karev, Justin Chambers, treats a young patient named Hayley, played by Demi Lovato; she was recently diagnosed with schizophrenia. Her parents brought her in because she was trying to claw her eyes out. When she heard that she is being committed to the psychiatric center, she yells "I'm not crazy" and threatens to kill herself with a syringe. Karev calms her down by agreeing to run more tests on her. Another patient, named Amber, is in the hospital to get hair restoration surgery. She received severe wounds from a car fire and has half of her head and face burned. Betty and Henry tell their doctors about their past together. Betty was best friends with Henry's fiancé. They were in love, but could not be together because of the scandal it would cause.

Hayley gets more tests done to determine if she really is schizophrenic; Karev thinks that she was misdiagnosed. Later, Dr. Lexie Grey, played by Chyler Leigh, asks Karev if they are a couple and he says they are. Meredith warns Christina about her suspicions of Owen and Teddy. This causes Christina to question her relationship with Owen and makes her mad at Meredith for "planting a seed of doubt". At lunch, Lexie helps Karev find a book that will help diagnose Hayley. He then runs a final test on her, which proves him right. Hayley is not schizophrenic. She has a small hole in her inner ear that causes her to be overly sensitive to sound; she can hear everything going on inside her body.

Bailey sees Ben who seems to be flirting with a nurse. She is very upset and leaves without giving him a chance to explain himself. The burn victim, Amanda, has an infection in her hand, which means she has to get three fingers cut off, resulting in the postponing of her hair restoration surgery. This upsets her but her good friend Trish, who also is a burn victim, tries to comfort her. Betty and Henry are put in the same room so that they can continue talking and catching up. Henry asks Betty to move in with him but she says she got over him and moved on with her life. 
Amanda is in her surgery and Mark decides to go on with the hair restoration surgery because her infection looks contained. After her surgery, Amanda is upset about the scar the hair restoration surgery left and Trish tells her to be happy that she is alive. Amanda yells at Trish for not letting her feel sad about her situation. Trish has an outburst that shows how she is just bitter about her own situation as Amanda is. Lexie admits to Dr. Callie Torres, Sara Ramirez during surgery that she is jealous that Reed slept with Mark even though she says she is over him.

Meredith yells at Owen and says Christina loves him and she hates him. She says she knows he tried to get Teddy fired and she thinks it is because he has feelings for her. She demands that he tells Christina. Callie tells Mark that he should talk to Lexie because she knows they are still in love with each other. Owen brings Christina to the stair well and tells her about Teddy. Christina asks what is going on between them. He says he doesn't know and doesn't have to explain himself. He says Teddy is a trigger for his PTSD. A pager goes off and reveals that Teddy was in the stair well and heard everything they said. Henry is in cardiac arrest and Betty is very scared for him. They bring him back and right away, Betty agrees to move in with him. He then proposes to her. Hayley wakes up after surgery and is excited to hear normally again. 
Bailey yells at Ben for flirting with the nurse. He explains that the nurse is mean to everyone but because he flirts, she is nice to him and it makes his life easier. He says he uses his good flirting on Bailey because he really cares for her. She says she does not have time to play games because she has a child, a full-time job, and is going through a divorce. He reassures her that his feelings are real and he is not playing games. Mark tells Lexie that he is still in love with her. She says, "I have a boyfriend" and he replies, "I'm just saying, you could have a husband". Callie and Dr. Arizona Robbins, played by Jessica Capshaw, start kissing in the elevator even though they are separated and have not talked in a while. That night, Christina tells Meredith that she is not moving in with Owen and Meredith says Christina gets her own room in the house she and Derek are building in the woods.

References

External links
 

2010 American television episodes
Grey's Anatomy (season 6) episodes